Forgotten Faces may refer to:

Forgotten Faces (1928 film), American silent drama
Forgotten Faces (1936 film), American sound remake of above
Forgotten Faces (1946 film), Greek film
Forgotten Faces (1952 film), Mexican film